Acrolepiopsis halosticta is a moth of the family Acrolepiidae. It was described by Edward Meyrick in 1914. It is found in Africa (Nyassaland, Ruo Valley).

References

Moths described in 1914
Acrolepiidae